John Francis "Chick" Meehan (September 5, 1893 – November 9, 1972) was an American football player and coach. He served as the head football coach at Syracuse University (1920–1924), New York University (1925–1931), and Manhattan College (1932–1937), compiling a career college football record of 115–44–14. Meehan played quarterback at Syracuse from 1915 to 1917.

Meehan stated, "We learn practically nothing from a victory. All our information comes from a defeat. A winner forgets most of his mistakes."

Coaching career

Syracuse
From 1920 to 1924, Meehan served as the head coach at Syracuse and compiled a 35–8–4 record. This total included back-to-back eight-win seasons in 1923 and 1924.

NYU
Meehan was the 19th head football coach at New York University (NYU), serving for seven seasons, from 1925 to 1931, and compiling a record of 49–15–4. This ranks him first at NYU in total wins and first at NYU in winning percentage. Meehan was awarded a place in NYU's athletic hall of fame for his coaching efforts.

Manhattan
Meehan's last head coaching job was as at Manhattan College. He held that position for six seasons, from 1932 until 1937. His career coaching record at Manhattan was 31–21–6. This ranks him first at Manhattan in total wins and second at Manhattan in winning percentage.

Death
Meehan died at the age of 79 on November 9, 1972 at a hospital in Syracuse, New York.

Head coaching record

Football

References

External links
 

1893 births
1972 deaths
American football quarterbacks
Manhattan Jaspers football coaches
NYU Violets football coaches
Syracuse Orange football coaches
Syracuse Orange football players
Syracuse Orangemen baseball players
Syracuse Stars (baseball)